Baker High School (BHS) is a public high school in Baker City, Oregon, United States. It is part of the Baker School District 5J.

History 

In 1889, Baker City built a school housing 12 grades, the second public high school in Oregon. In 1989, the school was mostly destroyed in a fire, although no one was hurt. A new building was completed in 1991.

Athletics 
The boys' basketball team won the 4A State Championship in 2007. The varsity football team won state championships in 2010 and 2012.
2019 girls basketball won the state 4A championship.

Activities 
Bel Canto Choir received first place in the State Choir Championship 3A and 4A in 2006, 2007, and 2008.

Notable alumni 
 Bobb McKittrick, NFL player
 Gerald F. Schroeder, former chief justice of the Idaho Supreme Court
 William Tebeau, first African-American man to graduate from Oregon State College and engineer
 Dylan Estabrooks, Notable Cheerleader

References

External links 
 

High schools in Baker County, Oregon
Buildings and structures in Baker City, Oregon
Public high schools in Oregon
School fires
1989 fires in the United States
1989 in Oregon